Stephen Fasano, better known by his stage name The Magician, is a Belgian DJ and record producer from Namur, in Belgium. He is best known for his 2011 remix of Lykke Li's "I Follow Rivers", his single Sunlight feat. Years & Years and 2014 remix of Clean Bandit's "Rather Be" which were worldwide hits. In 2014 he received the Electro award during Belgian ceremony Les Octaves de la musique. 
His monthly mixtapes called "Magic Tapes", which he started releasing in the mid 2010s, feature new dance music from an array of genres.

Career

2007–2010: Aeroplane

He was a member of music duo Aeroplane with Vito de Luca since 2007. In 2010, Fasano announced that he was leaving the duo to start his own solo project. De Luca continues to use the name Aeroplane.

2011–2013: Twist
In 2011 he released his debut EP Twist on the hip French label Kitsuné in collaboration with Yuksek as Peter and The Magician. In October 2011 he released his debut single "I Don't Know What to Do" featuring Jeppe Laursen on Kitsuné. In 2012 he released the single "Memory" again with Yuksek as Peter and The Magician on Kitsuné. In September 2013 he released the single "When the Night Is Over", and also later released the single "On My Brain" on Party Fine Music.

2014–2019: Breakthrough
In July 2014 he released the single "Sunlight" featuring vocals from Years & Years; the song peaked at number 7 in Belgium. The song was released in the United Kingdom on 28 September 2014. The Magician performed "Sunlight" along with Years & Years at the 2014 MTV Europe Music Awards in Glasgow, Scotland as part of the Digital Show which was held at the O2 Academy Glasgow.
In July 2014 he launches his own label Potion Records to release his own music as well as the music of others. Artists like Fabich, The Aston Shuffle, Bobby Nourmand, Just Kiddin, Endor and Aevion released music with Potion Records. The label takes a break in 2019.
In parallel, The Magician tours mainly in the United States and in Europe. He also performed at Tomorrowland in 2018.

2020–present: Renaissance
The Magician maintains a solid rhythm in releasing remixes. He also releases the Renaissance EP in May 2020. In parallel, he takes advantage of quarantine to launch his live Vinyl Home Show SUPERVISION. Later this year he relaunched his label Potion Records in collaboration with French music company Unity Group and released music from Soda State and Aevion.

The album Magic Tape 100 should be released in 2021.

Discography

EPs

Extended plays

Singles

Singles as Peter and The Magician

References

Notes
 A  "I Don't Know What to Do" did not enter the Ultratop 50, but peaked at number 55 on the Flemish Ultratip chart.
 B  "I Don't Know What to Do" did not enter the Ultratop 50, but peaked at number 23 on the Walloon Ultratip chart.
 C  "When the Night Is Over" did not enter the Ultratop 50, but peaked at number 26 on the Flemish Ultratip chart.
 D  "Together" did not enter the Ultratop 50, but peaked at number 7 on the Walloon Ultratip chart.
 E  "Tied Up" did not enter the Ultratop 50, but peaked at number 3 on the Walloon Ultratip chart.
 F  "Las Vegas" did not enter the Ultratop 50, but peaked at number 15 on the Flemish Ultratip chart.
 G  "Las Vegas" did not enter the Ultratop 50, but peaked at number 36 on the Walloon Ultratip chart.
 H  "Build a Fire" did not enter the Ultratop 50, but peaked at number 27 on the Flemish Ultratip chart.
 I  "Build a Fire" did not enter the Ultratop 50, but peaked at number 31 on the Walloon Ultratip chart.

Sources

External links
 Official website
 
 
 

Living people
Musicians from Brussels
Belgian DJs
Belgian record producers
Future house musicians
Belgian house musicians
Kitsuné artists
Electronic dance music DJs
Year of birth missing (living people)